Alessandro Malladra (Turin, 1865 – Rome, 1945) was an Italian volcanologist. He was professor of natural sciences in the College Mellerio Rosmini-Domodossola. He got involved in the construction of the Simplon Tunnel. He succeeded Giuseppe Mercalli on the Vesuvius Observatory, first as curator, afterwards as director (1927–1935). He was also general secretary of the Volcanology Section of the International Union of Geodesy and Geophysics (1919–1936), and at the same time its president for one period (1930–1933). The mineral malladrite (03.CH.05, a fluorosilicate) was named in his honour.

Selected publications

References 
Maddalena De Lucia, Massimo Russo, "120 Years of Italian and Vesuvius History in the Lava Medals Collection of the Osservatorio Vesuviano", poster.
History of the Vesuvius Observatory.
Treccani.it - L'Enciclopedia italiana.

20th-century Italian geologists
Italian volcanologists
1865 births
1945 deaths
19th-century Italian geologists